In computing, the Executable and Linkable Format (ELF, formerly named Extensible Linking Format), is a common standard file format for executable files, object code, shared libraries, and core dumps. First published in the specification for the application binary interface (ABI) of the Unix operating system version named System V Release 4 (SVR4), and later in the Tool Interface Standard, it was quickly accepted among different vendors of Unix systems. In 1999, it was chosen as the standard binary file format for Unix and Unix-like systems on x86 processors by the 86open project.

By design, the ELF format is flexible, extensible, and cross-platform. For instance, it supports different endiannesses and address sizes so it does not exclude any particular central processing unit (CPU) or instruction set architecture. This has allowed it to be adopted by many different operating systems on many different hardware platforms.

File layout 

Each ELF file is made up of one ELF header, followed by file data. The data can include:
 Program header table, describing zero or more memory segments
 Section header table, describing zero or more sections
 Data referred to by entries in the program header table or section header table

The segments contain information that is needed for run time execution of the file, while sections contain important data for linking and relocation. Any byte in the entire file can be owned by one section at most, and orphan bytes can occur which are unowned by any section.

File header 

The ELF header defines whether to use 32-bit or 64-bit addresses. The header contains three fields that are affected by this setting and offset other fields that follow them. The ELF header is 52 or 64 bytes long for 32-bit and 64-bit binaries respectively.

Program header 

The program header table tells the system how to create a process image. It is found at file offset , and consists of  entries, each with size . Each entry is structured as:

Section header

Tools 

 readelf is a Unix binary utility that displays information about one or more ELF files. A free software implementation is provided by GNU Binutils.
 elfutils provides alternative tools to GNU Binutils purely for Linux.
 elfdump is a command for viewing ELF information in an ELF file, available under Solaris and FreeBSD.
 objdump provides a wide range of information about ELF files and other object formats. objdump uses the Binary File Descriptor library as a back-end to structure the ELF data.
 The Unix file utility can display some information about ELF files, including the instruction set architecture for which the code in a relocatable, executable, or shared object file is intended, or on which an ELF core dump was produced.

Applications

Unix-like systems 

The ELF format has replaced older executable formats in various environments.
It has replaced a.out and COFF formats in Unix-like operating systems:
 Linux
 Solaris / Illumos
 IRIX
 FreeBSD
 NetBSD
 OpenBSD
 Redox
 DragonFly BSD
 Syllable
 HP-UX (except for 32-bit PA-RISC programs which continue to use SOM)
 QNX Neutrino
 MINIX

Non-Unix adoption 

ELF has also seen some adoption in non-Unix operating systems, such as:
 OpenVMS, in its Itanium and amd64 versions
 BeOS Revision 4 and later for x86 based computers (where it replaced the Portable Executable format; the PowerPC version stayed with Preferred Executable Format)
 Haiku, an open source reimplementation of BeOS
 RISC OS
 Stratus VOS, in PA-RISC and x86 versions
 SkyOS
 Fuchsia OS
 Z/TPF
 HPE NonStop OS
 Deos

Microsoft Windows also uses the ELF format, but only for its Windows Subsystem for Linux compatibility system.

Game consoles 

Some game consoles also use ELF:
 PlayStation Portable, PlayStation Vita, PlayStation (console), PlayStation 2, PlayStation 3, PlayStation 4, PlayStation 5
 GP2X
 Dreamcast
 GameCube
 Nintendo 64
 Wii
 Wii U

PowerPC 

Other (operating) systems running on PowerPC that use ELF:
 AmigaOS 4, the ELF executable has replaced the prior Extended Hunk Format (EHF) which was used on Amigas equipped with PPC processor expansion cards.
 MorphOS
 AROS
 Café OS (The operating system ran on Wii U)

Mobile phones 

Some operating systems for mobile phones and mobile devices use ELF:
 Symbian OS v9 uses E32Image format that is based on the ELF file format;
 Sony Ericsson, for example, the W800i, W610, W300, etc.
 Siemens, the SGOLD and SGOLD2 platforms: from Siemens C65 to S75 and BenQ-Siemens E71/EL71;
 Motorola, for example, the E398, SLVR L7, v360, v3i (and all phone LTE2 which has the patch applied).
 Bada, for example, the Samsung Wave S8500.
 Nokia phones or tablets running the Maemo or the Meego OS, for example, the Nokia N900.
 Android uses ELF  (shared object) libraries for the Java Native Interface. With Android Runtime (ART), the default since Android 5.0 "Lollipop", all applications are compiled into native ELF binaries on installation.

Some phones can run ELF files through the use of a patch that adds assembly code to the main firmware, which is a feature known as ELFPack in the underground modding culture. The ELF file format is also used with the Atmel AVR (8-bit), AVR32
and with Texas Instruments MSP430 microcontroller architectures. Some implementations of Open Firmware can also load ELF files, most notably Apple's implementation used in almost all PowerPC machines the company produced.

Specifications 

 Generic:
 System V Application Binary Interface Edition 4.1 (1997-03-18)
 System V ABI Update (October 2009)
 AMD64:
 System V ABI, AMD64 Supplement
 Arm:
 ELF for the ARM Architecture
 IA-32:
 System V ABI, Intel386 Architecture Processor Supplement
 IA-64:
 Itanium Software Conventions and Runtime Guide (September 2000)
 M32R:
 M32R ELF ABI Supplement Version 1.2 (2004-08-26)
 MIPS:
 System V ABI, MIPS RISC Processor Supplement
 MIPS EABI documentation (2003-06-11)
 Motorola 6800:
 Motorola 8- and 16- bit Embedded ABI
 PA-RISC:
 ELF Supplement for PA-RISC Version 1.43 (October 6, 1997)
 PowerPC:
 System V ABI, PPC Supplement
 PowerPC Embedded Application Binary Interface 32-Bit Implementation (1995-10-01)
 64-bit PowerPC ELF Application Binary Interface Supplement Version 1.9 (2004)
 RISC-V:
 RISC-V ELF Specification
 SPARC:
 System V ABI, SPARC Supplement
 S/390:
 S/390 32bit ELF ABI Supplement
 zSeries:
 zSeries 64bit ELF ABI Supplement
 Symbian OS 9:
 E32Image file format on Symbian OS 9

The Linux Standard Base (LSB) supplements some of the above specifications for architectures in which it is specified. For example, that is the case for the System V ABI, AMD64 Supplement.

86open 
86open was a project to form consensus on a common binary file format for Unix and Unix-like operating systems on the common PC compatible x86 architecture, to encourage software developers to port to the architecture. The initial idea was to standardize on a small subset of Spec 1170, a predecessor of the Single UNIX Specification, and the GNU C Library (glibc) to enable unmodified binaries to run on the x86 Unix-like operating systems. The project was originally designated "Spec 150".

The format eventually chosen was ELF, specifically the Linux implementation of ELF, after it had turned out to be a de facto standard supported by all involved vendors and operating systems.

The group began email discussions in 1997 and first met together at the Santa Cruz Operation offices on August 22, 1997.

The steering committee was Marc Ewing, Dion Johnson, Evan Leibovitch, Bruce Perens, Andrew Roach, Bryan Wayne Sparks and Linus Torvalds. Other people on the project were Keith Bostic, Chuck Cranor, Michael Davidson, Chris G. Demetriou, Ulrich Drepper, Don Dugger, Steve Ginzburg, Jon "maddog" Hall, Ron Holt, Jordan Hubbard, Dave Jensen, Kean Johnston, Andrew Josey, Robert Lipe, Bela Lubkin, Tim Marsland, Greg Page, Ronald Joe Record, Tim Ruckle, Joel Silverstein, Chia-pi Tien, and Erik Troan. Operating systems and companies represented were BeOS, BSDI, FreeBSD, Intel, Linux, NetBSD, SCO and SunSoft.

The project progressed and in mid-1998, SCO began developing lxrun, an open-source compatibility layer able to run Linux binaries on OpenServer, UnixWare, and Solaris. SCO announced official support of lxrun at LinuxWorld in March 1999. Sun Microsystems began officially supporting lxrun for Solaris in early 1999, and later moved to integrated support of the Linux binary format via Solaris Containers for Linux Applications.

With the BSDs having long supported Linux binaries (through a compatibility layer) and the main x86 Unix vendors having added support for the format, the project decided that Linux ELF was the format chosen by the industry and "declare[d] itself dissolved" on July 25, 1999.

FatELF: universal binaries for Linux 
FatELF is an ELF binary-format extension that adds fat binary capabilities. It is aimed for Linux and other Unix-like operating systems. Additionally to the CPU architecture abstraction (byte order, word size, CPU instruction set etc.), there is the potential advantage of software-platform abstraction e.g., binaries which support multiple kernel ABI versions. , FatELF has not been integrated into the mainline Linux kernel.

See also 

 Application binary interface
 Comparison of executable file formats
 DWARF a format for debugging data
 Intel Binary Compatibility Standard
 Portable Executable format used by Windows
 vDSO virtual DSO
 Position-independent code

References

Further reading 

  Code:  Errata: 
 
 An unsung hero: The hardworking ELF by Peter Seebach, December 20, 2005, archived from the original on February 24, 2007
 
 The ELF Object File Format: Introduction, The ELF Object File Format by Dissection by Eric Youngdale (1995-05-01)
 A Whirlwind Tutorial on Creating Really Teensy ELF Executables for Linux by Brian Raiter
 ELF relocation into non-relocatable objects by Julien Vanegue (2003-08-13)
 Embedded ELF debugging without ptrace by the ELFsh team (2005-08-01)
 Study of ELF loading and relocs by Pat Beirne (1999-08-03)

External links 

 FreeBSD Handbook: Binary formats (archived version)
 FreeBSD  manual page
 NetBSD ELF FAQ
 Linux  manual page
 Oracle Solaris Linker and Libraries Guide
 The ERESI project : reverse engineering on ELF-based operating systems 
 Linux Today article on 86open July 26, 1999
 Announcement of 86open on Debian Announce mailing list October 10, 1997, Bruce Perens
 Declaration of Ulrich Drepper (PDF) in The SCO Group vs IBM, September 19, 2006
 86open and ELF discussion  on Groklaw, August 13, 2006

Executable file formats